Mabea is a plant genus of the family Euphorbiaceae first described in 1775.  It is native to Central and South America as well as Mexico and Trinidad.

Species

References

Hippomaneae
Euphorbiaceae genera